The 2000–01 Detroit Red Wings season was the 75th season of the Detroit franchise in the National Hockey League. The Red Wings qualified for the playoffs by finishing first in the Central Division, and were second overall in the Western Conference. The team was upset in the first round of the playoffs by the seventh-seeded Los Angeles Kings.

Off-season

Regular season
The Red Wings scored the most power-play goals in the NHL during the regular season, with 85.

On April 1, 2001, Steve Yzerman scored just 11 seconds into the overtime period to give the Wings a 2–1 home win over the Washington Capitals. It would prove to be the fastest overtime goal scored during the 2000–01 regular season.

Final standings

Schedule and results

Playoffs

The Detroit Red Wings ended the 2000–01 regular season as the Western Conference's second seed and played the seventh-seeded Los Angeles Kings in the Conference Quarterfinals. Detroit was defeated 4 games to 2, despite winning the first two games at home.

Player statistics

Skaters

Goaltending

† Denotes player spent time with another team before joining the Red Wings. Stats reflect time with the Red Wings only.

Note: GP = Games played; G = Goals; A = Assists; Pts = Points; +/- = Plus/minus; PIM = Penalty minutes;
      GS = Games started; TOI = Time on ice; W = Wins; L = Losses; T = Ties; GA = Goals against; GAA = Goals-against average; SO = Shutouts; SA=Shots against; SV% = Save percentage;

Awards and records
Scotty Bowman, Lester Patrick Trophy

Transactions

Draft picks
Detroit's draft picks at the 2000 NHL Entry Draft held at the Pengrowth Saddledome in Calgary, Alberta.

Farm teams
Cincinnati Mighty Ducks

See also
2000–01 NHL season

References

Detroit
Detroit
Detroit Red Wings seasons
Detroit Red Wings
Detroit Red Wings